"Safari Song" is a song by American rock band Greta Van Fleet. It was their second single off of their EP Black Smoke Rising, and their compilation EP From the Fires. It topped the Billboard Mainstream Rock Songs chart in February 2018.

Background
The song was initially released on the band's debut EP - Black Smoke Rising in April 2017. The song was released as the second single from the EP, after "Highway Tune", in October 2017, and was the second most added song to rock radio. Shortly afterwards, on November 10, 2017, a compilation EP, From the Fires, containing "Safari Song" and the other three songs from Black Smoke Rising, and four newly recorded songs, was released. The release of From the Fires pushed "Safari Song" to chart on the Billboard Hot Rock Songs chart at number 44, staying on the chart for four weeks.

The band performed the song live on national television on Last Call With Carson Daly on October 31, 2017.

Themes and composition
The song's sound has drawn comparisons to the work of Led Zeppelin, both in the song's production sounding similar to rock music from the 1960s, and  Josh Kiszka's vocals mirroring Robert Plant's "signature wail, phrasing, and articulation". Beyond the Led Zeppelin similarities, Loudwire also compared the song's vocal and guitar riff style to the work of Axl Rose of Guns N' Roses, Bon Scott of AC/DC and Mick Jagger of The Rolling Stones. Josh Kiszka said of the song's initial conception:

Sam Kiszka, the band's bassist, stated that the song's initial iteration was far more complicated, with more percussion and busy guitar-work in it. The band felt that they had added too many overdubs while recording the song's initial version in the studio, and ended up simplifying its composition and removing an extended drum interlude. The song's live performances often re-add a long drum solo at the end.

Personnel
Joshua Kiszka – lead vocals
Jacob Kiszka – guitar
Samuel Kiszka – bass guitar, keyboards
Daniel Wagner – drums

Charts

Weekly charts

Year-end charts

Certifications

References

Greta Van Fleet songs
2017 songs
2017 singles
Republic Records singles